Karlheinz Helmut Förster (born 25 July 1958) is a German former professional footballer who played as a central defender.

The younger brother of another football defender, Bernd Förster, he was regarded as one of the world's top man-markers at his peak, and played most of his career at VfB Stuttgart with Bernd. Both were crowned European champions in 1980.

Club career
Born in Mosbach, Förster started playing professionally at VfB Stuttgart, which would be his only club in the German first division. He was instrumental in the club's promotion in 1977, as he scored five times in 34 contests.

In the topflight, Förster rarely missed a game, partnering sibling Bernd in the backline. Both were instrumental in the club's 1983–84 league conquest and he left the club in 1986, having played in more than 300 overall official matches. He was then bought by France's Olympique de Marseille, for 3.5 million Deutsche Mark.

In his third year with L'OM, already partnered by countryman Klaus Allofs, Förster helped the side win the double. Having retired at nearly 32, he later became a player's agent.

International career
Förster gained the first of his 81 caps for the West Germany national team in a friendly with Brazil, on 5 April 1978, not yet aged 20. From then onwards, he became an undisputed starter, appearing in all the matches at the victorious Euro 1980 (completely neutralizing Belgium's Jan Ceulemans in the final) and the runner-up place at the 1982 FIFA World Cup (also playing all the minutes).

At the latter competition, the pair of brothers (Bernd had already been an important figure in the continental win) became the first in German football history to take part in a World Cup final since Ottmar and Fritz Walter's appearances in the victorious 1954 edition, and the first to be defeated.

Förster still played for his nation at the UEFA Euro 1984 and 1986 World Cup, finishing second to Argentina in the latter. In Mexico 86, he took the role of man to man marker, neutralizing Mexico's Hugo Sánchez at the quarterfinals and Michel Platini of France at the semifinals.

Career statistics
Scores and results list West Germany's goal tally first, score column indicates score after each Förster goal.

Honours
VfB Stuttgart
Bundesliga: 1983–84
DFB-Pokal runner-up: 1985–86

Marseille
Division 1: 1988–89, 1989–90
Coupe de France: 1988–89; runner-up: 1986–87

West Germany
UEFA European Championship: 1980
FIFA World Cup runner-up: 1982, 1986

Individual
kicker Bundesliga Team of the Season: 1977–78, 1983–84
UEFA European Championship Team of the Tournament: 1980, 1984
FIFA World Cup All-Star Team: 1986
Footballer of the Year (Germany): 1982

References

External links
 
 

1958 births
Living people
German footballers
Association football defenders
Bundesliga players
2. Bundesliga players
VfB Stuttgart players
Ligue 1 players
Olympique de Marseille players
Germany international footballers
Germany B international footballers
UEFA Euro 1980 players
1982 FIFA World Cup players
UEFA Euro 1984 players
1986 FIFA World Cup players
UEFA European Championship-winning players
West German expatriate footballers
West German footballers
West German expatriate sportspeople in France
Expatriate footballers in France
Footballers from Baden-Württemberg